The 2021 USL Championship season was the eleventh season of the USL Championship and the fifth season under Division II  sanctioning. This was the third season under the name "USL Championship", having used the name "United Soccer League" through 2018. The 2021 season saw 31 teams participate in four divisions during the regular season.

Changes from 2020
Expansion clubs
 Oakland Roots SC (joined from NISA)

Departing clubs
 North Carolina FC (moved to USL League One)
Philadelphia Union II (withdrawn by MLS parent club)
 Portland Timbers 2 (withdrawn by MLS parent club)
 Reno 1868 FC (folded)
 Saint Louis FC (folded in favor of future St. Louis City SC of MLS)

Teams

The following teams are playing in the 2021 USL Championship season:

Conference Tables

Western Conference

Eastern Conference

Competition format
The COVID-19 pandemic has resulted in some changes from the most recent pre-COVID format involving two stand alone conferences. For this season, each of the conferences will be further split into two divisions, Atlantic and Central in the Eastern Conference and Mountain and Pacific in the Western Conference, creating four geographically based divisions of 8 (or 7) teams. The teams will play a 32-game schedule in a 27-week period starting around May 1. Individual teams can start their seasons between April 24 and May 15, based on crowd restrictions due to the COVID-19 pandemic. During the regular season, each team will play its division opponents four times – twice home, twice away, for a total of 28 (or in the Mountain Division, 24) games, making up the bulk of each team's season. The remaining games in each teams schedule will be played against regional or cross-conference opponents.

Managerial changes

Results table

Playoffs

Bracket

Conference quarter-finals

Conference semi-finals

Conference finals

USL Championship Final

Average home attendances
Ranked from highest to lowest average attendance.

Updated to games of June 18, 2021.
Note: Stadium capacities are reduced to promote social distancing due to the COVID-19 pandemic.

*Statistic may be incorrect due to no official attendance being released by neither the league nor club for one or more game(s); average attendances do not include the unreported matches.

Regular season statistical leaders

Top scorers

Hat-tricks

Notes
(H) – Home team(A) – Away team

Top assists

Clean sheets

League awards

Individual awards

All-league teams

Monthly awards

Weekly awards

References

	

 
2021
2021 in American soccer leagues
Association football events postponed due to the COVID-19 pandemic